Neopheosia is a monotypic moth genus of the family Notodontidae described by Shōnen Matsumura in 1920. Its only species, Neopheosia fasciata, was first described by Frederic Moore in 1888. It is found in the Himalayas, Taiwan, Sundaland, Buru and Japan.

The wingspan is 45–50 mm. The forewing pattern consists of black and brown streaks on a pale yellow ground colour.

The larvae feed on cherries. They are pale green with a dorsal series of dark red quadrate marks. The head is streaked with dark red.

Subspecies
Neopheosia fasciata fasciata
Neopheosia fasciata japonica Okano, 1955 (Japan)

References

Moths described in 1888
Notodontidae
Moths of Japan
Monotypic moth genera